McMinn Airport  is a privately owned public-use airport located one nautical mile (1.85 km) southwest of the central business district of Weaver, a city in Calhoun County, Alabama, United States.

Facilities and aircraft 
It has one runway designated 8/26 with an asphalt surface measuring 2,650 by 30 feet (808 x 9 m).

For the 12-month period ending May 12, 1998, the airport had 6,420 aircraft operations, an average of 17 per day, all general aviation. At that time there were 24 aircraft based at this airport: 100% single-engine.

This airport has since been closed. It is no longer listed as active with the FAA, and the runway clearly has the closed "X" marks on it.

References

External links 
 Aerial image as of 7 March 1997 from USGS The National Map
 Airfield photos for 25A from Civil Air Patrol

Airports in Alabama
Transportation buildings and structures in Calhoun County, Alabama